Yury Kendysh (born 10 June 1990) is a Belarusian professional football player.

Honours
Žalgiris Vilnius
A Lyga champion: 2015
Lithuanian Football Cup winner: 2014–15

BATE Borisov
Belarusian Premier League champion: 2016, 2017
Belarusian Super Cup winner: 2016, 2017

Sheriff Tiraspol
Moldovan National Division champion: 2017, 2018, 2019
Moldovan Cup winner: 2018–19

Shakhtyor Soligorsk
Belarusian Premier League champion: 2020, 2021
Belarusian Super Cup winner: 2021

Individual
Moldovan National Division Top Scorer 2019

External links
 
 

1990 births
Living people
Belarusian footballers
Association football midfielders
Belarus international footballers
Belarusian expatriate footballers
Expatriate footballers in Lithuania
Expatriate footballers in Moldova
Expatriate footballers in Latvia
Belarusian expatriate sportspeople in Lithuania
Belarusian expatriate sportspeople in Moldova
A Lyga players
Belarusian Premier League players
Moldovan Super Liga players
FC PMC Postavy players
FC Partizan Minsk players
FC Torpedo-BelAZ Zhodino players
FC Slavia Mozyr players
FC Dynamo Brest players
FK Žalgiris players
FC BATE Borisov players
FC Sheriff Tiraspol players
FC Shakhtyor Soligorsk players
Riga FC players
Belarusian expatriate sportspeople in Latvia